Mariya Karakasheva (born ) is a Bulgarian female volleyball player who is part of the Bulgaria women's national volleyball team and plays for CSM Volei Alba Blaj.

She participated at the 2009 Women's European Volleyball Championship, and at the 2013 FIVB Volleyball World Grand Prix.

References

External links
 Profile at FIVB.org

1988 births
Living people
Bulgarian women's volleyball players
Bulgarian expatriate sportspeople in Romania
Bulgarian expatriates in Russia
Expatriate volleyball players in Russia
Bulgarian expatriates in Italy
Expatriate volleyball players in Italy
Bulgarian expatriate sportspeople in Poland
Expatriate volleyball players in Poland
Opposite hitters